Chapultepec is a small town and municipality in the State of Mexico in Mexico. The municipality covers an area of 10.45 km².

Etymology
The name Chapultepec comes from Náhuatl meaning hill of the Grasshoppers

Geography
The municipality of Chapultepec, which has a geographical extent of 9.676 km2 (6012.388 sq mi). The municipality is bordered by the municipalities of Toluca, Metepec, Mexicaltzingo, Calimaya and Tianguistenco.

In 2010, the municipality had a total population of 12,120.

References

Municipalities of the State of Mexico
Populated places in the State of Mexico